Eugene Scott (born August 31, 1889) was a  Negro leagues catcher for several years before the founding of the first Negro National League.

References

External links
 and Baseball-Reference Black Baseball stats and Seamheads

Detroit Stars players
1889 births
1947 deaths
20th-century African-American people